Glen Pass (also known as Blue Flower Pass) is a mountain pass in the Sierra Nevada, located in Kings Canyon National Park, eastern Fresno County, California, United States. This pass, on the John Muir Trail, links Rae Lakes at  elevation with Charlotte Lake at  elevation.

The pass was named after Glen H. Crow, a Forest Service ranger.

References 

Mountain passes on the John Muir Trail
Landforms of Fresno County, California